Ashuapmushuan may refer to: 

 Unorganized territory of Lac-Ashuapmushuan, Quebec, Canada
 Ashuapmushuan Wildlife Reserve, Quebec, Canada
 Ashuapmushuan Lake, in the Ashuapmushuan Wildlife Reserve
 Ashuapmushuan River, Quebec, Canada